Esteban Márquez de Velasco (1652–1696) was a Spanish Baroque painter.

Biography
Márquez de Velasco was born in Puebla de Guzmán (Huelva). He moved at an early age to Seville with his uncle Fernando Márquez, currently an unknown painter, with whom he worked until 1672. His works show a strong dependence on the known art of Bartolomé Esteban Murillo, who was very popular at the time. He most likely worked in one of Murillo's workshops, which had a very abundant production of works.

Works
The signed and dated works, from which it has been possible to set his style, however, are rare and late date:
Lactation of Saint Dominic, dated 1693, preserved in the parish of Santa Maria de las Nieves ("Church of Saint Mary of the Snows")
Christ and the Virgin as protectors of the youth, dated 1694, large oil painting from the College of San Telmo in Seville, where he was installed in the refectory, now preserved in the auditorium of the University of Seville.
Also signed were four stories of a holy martyr, present whereabouts unknown
St. Augustine and St. Joseph with the Child, Museum of Fine Arts of Seville
A series of the Life of St. Francis of Assisi, preserved in Guadalajara (Mexico)
Life of the Virgin, from the convent of the Trinity in Seville

References
Pérez Sánchez, Alfonso E. (1992). Baroque Painting in Spain 1600–1750. Madrid: Ediciones Chair. .
Valdivieso, E. and Serrera, JM, Season of Murillo. Antecedents and consequences of his painting, exhibition catalog, Palace of Aranjuez, 1982 SE 225-1982 Legal Deposit.

1652 births
1696 deaths
17th-century Spanish painters
Spanish male painters
Spanish Baroque painters